Shan Wijayalal De Silva is a Sri Lankan politician. He is a Member of Parliament (MP) for Galle District since 2020. He belongs to the Sri Lanka Freedom Party and part of the United People's Freedom Alliance.
He was previously served three times as the Chief Minister of the Southern Province from 2004 to 2019. Several months after leaving the office, Shan Wijayalal De Silva was sworn in as the new Governor of the Eastern Province On 5 June 2019 before the President Maithripala Sirisena at the Presidential Secretariat, Colombo.

References

Sri Lankan Buddhists
Chief Ministers of Southern Province, Sri Lanka
Provincial councillors of Sri Lanka
Living people
Sri Lanka Freedom Party politicians
United People's Freedom Alliance politicians
Alumni of Dharmasoka College
People from Ambalangoda
Sinhalese politicians
Members of the 16th Parliament of Sri Lanka
1959 births